The Communauté urbaine Angers Loire Métropole is the communauté urbaine, an intercommunal structure, centred on the city of Angers. It is located in the Maine-et-Loire department, in the Pays de la Loire region, western France. It was created in January 2016, replacing the previous Communauté d'agglomération d'Angers Loire Métropole. It was expanded with the commune of Loire-Authion in January 2018. Its area is 666.7 km2. Its population was 299,476 in 2018, of which 154,508 in Angers proper.

Composition
The Communauté urbaine Angers Loire Métropole gathers 29 communes:

Angers
Avrillé
Beaucouzé
Béhuard
Bouchemaine
Briollay
Cantenay-Épinard
Écouflant
Écuillé
Feneu
Loire-Authion
Longuenée-en-Anjou
Montreuil-Juigné
Mûrs-Erigné
Le Plessis-Grammoire
Les Ponts-de-Cé
Rives-du-Loir-en-Anjou
Saint-Barthélemy-d'Anjou
Saint-Clément-de-la-Place
Sainte-Gemmes-sur-Loire
Saint-Lambert-la-Potherie
Saint-Léger-de-Linières
Saint-Martin-du-Fouilloux
Sarrigné
Savennières
Soulaines-sur-Aubance
Soulaire-et-Bourg
Trélazé
Verrières-en-Anjou

References

Angers
Angers
States and territories established in 2016
Angers